Kaushalya Gajasinghe (born 19 November 1991) is a Sri Lankan cricketer. He made his first-class debut for Lankan Cricket Club in the 2011–12 Premier Trophy on 10 February 2012.

References

External links
 

1991 births
Living people
Sri Lankan cricketers
Galle Cricket Club cricketers
Kandy Customs Sports Club cricketers
Lankan Cricket Club cricketers
Moors Sports Club cricketers
Ragama Cricket Club cricketers
Cricketers from Galle